Jack Cochrane (born February 9, 1999) is an American football linebacker for the Kansas City Chiefs of the National Football League (NFL). He played college football at South Dakota.

College career
Cochrane was a member of the South Dakota Coyotes for five seasons. Cochrane used the extra year of eligibility granted to college athletes in 2020 due to the COVID-19 pandemic and returned to South Dakota for a fifth season. He finished the season with 103 tackles.

Professional career
Cochrane signed with the Kansas City Chiefs as an undrafted free agent on May 1, 2022. He was waived on August 30, 2022, and signed to the practice squad the next day. Cochrane was signed to the Chiefs' active roster on September 13, 2022. Cochrane won Super Bowl LVII when the Chiefs defeated the Philadelphia Eagles 38-35 with Cochrane recording one tackle in the game.

References

External links
South Dakota Coyotes bio
Kansas City Chiefs bio

Living people
Players of American football from Iowa
American football linebackers
South Dakota Coyotes football players
Kansas City Chiefs players
1999 births
People from Mount Vernon, Iowa